Espressino is an Italian coffee drink originating in the southern region of Apulia. Espressino is usually served in a demitasse.

Composition
It is prepared with equal parts of espresso and milk, with some cocoa powder on the bottom of the cup and on top of the drink. An espressino freddo is a cold coffee drink with differing ingredients. It is similar to the marocchino and bicerin.

See also

 List of coffee beverages

References

Coffee drinks
Italian drinks
Chocolate drinks
Coffee in Italy